

See also
Media in Canada

Nunavut
Television